This article presents a list of the historical events and publications of Australian literature during 1936.

Books 

 Dymphna Cusack – Jungfrau
 Eleanor Dark – Return to Coolami
 Jean Devanny – Sugar Heaven
 M. Barnard Eldershaw – The Glasshouse
 Miles Franklin – All That Swagger
 Arthur Gask – The Master Spy
 Henry George Lamond – Amathea: The Story of a Horse
 Will Lawson – When Cobb and Co. was King
 Jack Lindsay – The Triumphant Beast
 Jack McLaren – The Crystal Skull
 A. B. Paterson — The Shearer's Colt
 Brian Penton – Inheritors
 Alice Grant Rosman – Mother of the Bride
 Christina Stead – The Beauties and Furies
 E. V. Timms – Uncivilised
 Arthur Upfield – Wings above the Diamantina

Short stories 

 Arthur Gask – The Passion Years
 Jack Lindsay – Come Home at Last
 Dal Stivens – The Tramp and Other Stories

Children's 
 Martin Boyd – The Painted Princess
 Mary Grant Bruce – Circus Ring
 Dorothy Cottrell – Wilderness Orphan
 Mary Durack & Elizabeth Durack – Chunuma
 Norman Lindsay – The Flyaway Highway

Poetry 

 Rex Ingamells – "Garrakeen"
 Will Lawson – "Old River Days"
 Douglas Stewart – Green Lions: Poems

Biography 

 Daisy Bates – My Natives and I
 Ion Idriess – The Cattle King

Awards and honours

Literary

Births 

A list, ordered by date of birth (and, if the date is either unspecified or repeated, ordered alphabetically by surname) of births in 1936 of Australian literary figures, authors of written works or literature-related individuals follows, including year of death.

 15 January – Kate Llewellyn, poet
 1 February – Marian Eldridge, short story writer, poet and book reviewer (died 1997)
 13 February – Judith Rodriguez, poet (died 2018)
 28 February – Robin Klein, writer for children
 13 October – Robert Ingpen, artist and writer for children
 27 December – Alex Miller, novelist

Unknown date
 Brian Matthews, biographer and academic

Deaths 

A list, ordered by date of death (and, if the date is either unspecified or repeated, ordered alphabetically by surname) of deaths in 1936 of Australian literary figures, authors of written works or literature-related individuals follows, including year of birth.

 4 March – Arthur H. Adams, poet and editor (born 1872)
 23 March – Oscar Asche, playwright and novelist (born 1871)
 26 July – Emily Coungeau, poet (born 1860)
 20 August – Agnes L. Storrie, poet and writer (born 1864)

See also 
 1936 in poetry
 List of years in literature
 List of years in Australian literature
 1936 in literature
 1935 in Australian literature
 1936 in Australia
 1937 in Australian literature

References

Literature
Australian literature by year
20th-century Australian literature